Paltaban, also called Faltaban, is an island located in the Philippine island Province of Masbate. The northwest side of the island has a rock cliff.

See also

 List of islands of the Philippines

References

Islands of Masbate